Kuh-e Mobarak or Kuh Mobarak or Kuhmobarak or Kooh Mobarak or Kuh-i-Mubarak may refer to:
 Mogh-e Qanbareh-ye Kuh Mobarak
 Sangari Mach
 Tambaseyun-e Kuh Mobarak